The Holly Creek Formation is a geologic formation in Arkansas. It preserves fossils dating back to the Cretaceous period which belong to the Trinity Group.

Flora 

 Cheirolepidiaceae

Fauna 

 Indeterminate Chondrichthyes
 Indeterminate Actinopterygii
 Indeterminate Amiidae
 Indeterminate Semionotiformes
 Indeterminate Pycnodontiformes
 Anomoeodus caddoi 
 Lissamphibia
 Indeterminate Helochelydridae 
 Naomichelys sp.
 Indeterminate Trionychids
 Indeterminate Coelognathosuchia
 Squamata
 Sciroseps pawhuskai
 Dinosauria
 Acrocanthosaurus sp.
 Deinonychus sp.
 Richardoestesia sp.
 Indeterminate Titanosauria
 Indeterminate Nodosauria

See also

 List of fossiliferous stratigraphic units in Arkansas
 Paleontology in Arkansas

References

 

Cretaceous Arkansas